"Pilot" is the series premiere and television pilot of Pretty Little Liars: The Perfectionists. The series is an adaption of young adult novel The Perfectionists by Sara Shepard, as well as a spin-off and sequel of Pretty Little Liars. The episode aired on March 20, 2019, on Freeform.

In the episode, Alison DiLaurentis moves to the fictional Beacon Heights, Oregon to start a new life. She begins to suspect things aren't right when she finds former friend Mona Vanderwaal. Alison begins looking for answers but things intensify quickly when a student is found murdered. It was written by I. Marlene King and directed by Elizabeth Allen Rosenbaum. The episode received mostly positive reviews and was watched live by 0.46 million viewers.

Plot
Alison DiLaurentis moves from Rosewood, Pennsylvania to Beacon Heights, Oregon to begin a job as a teaching assistant at Beacon Heights University (BHU). She arrives and begins getting settled before being startled by former friend Mona Vanderwaal, who turns out to be Head of Recruitment and Admissions at BHU. Mona informs Alison that she moved back from France when she decided to do something more meaningful with her life. Mona begins showing Alison around and learns that Taylor Hotchkiss, the daughter of the university's founder, killed herself a year ago.

After class Nolan asks Dylan to continue their deal from last year in which he writes all of his and Ava's homework essays. Alison approaches Mona about Nolan, Mona tells Alison that she thinks he could be dangerous and warns her to stay away from him. While grading the essays she assigned, Alison begins suspecting plagiarism between Ava, Nolan, and Dylan. Alison questions Ava about her paper but gets no answers from her. At the welcome back party, Alison meets Claire Hotchkiss, Nolan and Taylor's mother and is told by Claire that she reminds her of Taylor. Alison finally questions Dylan about the papers and gives him the option of having twenty-four hours to tell the truth or be expelled.

Nolan visits a cabin in the woods and it is revealed that Taylor is not really dead. The two are working together to bring down "Beacon Guard", BHU's security system because they believe it's being used to spy on students. Caitlin, Ava, and Dylan all meet in the woods and decide that they're all tired of Nolan and joke about murdering him. Alison confronts Mona and asks her why she's really there, Mona tells her that she brought her to help people so that no one else at BHU gets hurt. Alison rips wallpaper off the wall to find the words "They're Watching" written on the wall. Nolan meets a mysterious figure on the roof in an attempt to get them to help his and Taylor's cause.

Alison hears sirens and goes outside and finds Nolan impaled on a fence. Caitlin, Ava, and Dylan realize that he was murdered in the same way as their fantasy. Mona goes inside the bathroom and begins talking to the mirror demanding answers. A person in the control room sees Mona through a camera and orders her to go to her safe place.

Production

Development
On October 29, 2013, it was announced that The CW was developing a television series based on The Perfectionists, a novel by Sara Shepard. The series was set to be executive produced by Leslie Morgenstein and Cheryl Dolins as well as Arika Lisanne Mittman who was also set to write for the series. Over a year on November 5, 2014, later it was revealed that production of the series had moved to ABC Family. Mittman was removed from the series and I. Marlene King took over as executive producer, the network was also searching for a new writer for the series. No news of the series came until September 2017 when it was announced that the series was being re-developed by Freeform, as a spin-off and sequel of Pretty Little Liars. It was also announced that King would write the script, Gina Girolamo joined the series as an executive producer. Charlie Craig who previously worked on Pretty Little Liars with King joined the series as executive producer and co-showrunner. The pilot episode was directed by Elizabeth Allen Rosenbaum. On February 5, 2019, it was revealed that the series was set to premiere on March 20, 2019.

Casting
In late September 2017, Sasha Pieterse and Janel Parrish were first to be cast in the series as Pretty Little Liars characters Alison DiLaurentis and Mona Vanderwaal, respectively. Sofia Carson was next to be cast as Ava Jalali. Sydney Park, Eli Brown, and Kelly Rutherford were also all cast in the series with Freeform calling it "the perfect cast". Graeme Thomas King was last to be cast as Jeremy.

Filming
The episode was filmed on location in Portland, Oregon. King confirmed on Twitter that filming would start in March 2018. Production started on February 27, 2018, with a table read for the pilot. Filming for the pilot started on March 12, 2018, and wrapped in the last week of the same month.

Reception

Critical response
Alex Zalben with Decider stated "Clearly whatever was going on with Nolan and his sister goes beyond hot people hooking up and lies and secrets; it's a massive conspiracy with insane, next level surveillance technology." Devon Ivie with Vulture.com said that "Sasha Pieterse and Janel Parrish Are Bringing ‘Old Married Couple’ Energy to The Perfectionists". Meanwhile, Amanda Lundgren of Cosmopolitan stated "Even though The Perfectionists is a brand-new show, the ghosts of PLL's past can't help but follow."

Viewing figures
The episode was watched by 0.46 million U.S. viewers.

Notes

References

External links
 

2019 American television episodes
Pretty Little Liars: The Perfectionists